Jaeger 70 (also known as Munson) is a hybrid of two American species of grape, Vitis lincecumii and Vitis rupestris developed by Hermann Jaeger (1844–1895), a Swiss-American who settled in Missouri. He named the successful hybrid for his friend and fellow grape breeder, T.V. Munson. However the grape has become better known by Jaeger's selection number, 70. The grape's primary importance is as the female progenitor of many French - American hybrid grapes in the breeding program run by viticulturist Albert Seibel.

Relationship to other grapes
Jaegar 70 was crossed with the Languedoc-Roussillon wine grape Aramon noir to create the hybrid variety Flot rouge.

References

Grape varieties
Hybrid grape varieties